Frimann is a given name. Notable people with the name include:

Vilhelm Frimann Koren Bjerknes (1862–1951), Norwegian physicist and meteorologist
Vilhelm Frimann Christie Bøgh (1817–1888), Norwegian archivist
Wilhelm Frimann Koren Christie (1778–1849), Norwegian constitutional father
Wilhelm Frimann Koren Christie (Nazi) (1885–1956), Norwegian jurist and Nazi collaborator
P. H. Frimann (1752–1839), Norwegian-Danish poet
Per Frimann (born 1962), Danish former football player
Kristofer Frimann Hjeltnes (1856–1930), Norwegian horticulturist and politician
Jakob Frimann Magnusson (born 1953), Icelandic composer, keyboard player, film director and producer
Christopher Frimann Omsen (1761–1829), Norwegian "Founding Father" and later Supreme Court Justice

See also
Freimann (disambiguation)
Friedemann
Friman